Aleksei Aleksandrovich Filippov (born 10 June 1973) is a former Russian professional footballer.

Club career
He made his professional debut in the Soviet Second League in 1990 for FC Tekstilshchik Ivanovo. He played 1 game in the UEFA Cup 1994–95 for FC Dynamo Moscow.

He played for FC Shinnik Yaroslavl in the Russian Cup.

Honours
 Russian Premier League runner-up: 1994.
 Russian Premier League bronze: 1993.
 Russian Cup winner: 1995.

References

1973 births
Sportspeople from Ivanovo
Living people
Soviet footballers
Russian footballers
Association football midfielders
Association football defenders
FC Dynamo Moscow players
Russian Premier League players
FC Chernomorets Novorossiysk players
FC Tekstilshchik Kamyshin players
FC Shinnik Yaroslavl players
FC Rubin Kazan players
FC Amkar Perm players
FC Luch Vladivostok players
FC Lokomotiv Nizhny Novgorod players
FC Metallurg Lipetsk players
FC Sheksna Cherepovets players
FC Spartak Kostroma players
FC Tekstilshchik Ivanovo players